The Fairway Island Lighthouse is a lighthouse located on the eastern entrance to Peril Strait, Alaska.
It is located on a small islet that lies between the southeastern end of Chichagof Island and northern Catherine Island, within the limits of Sitka City and Borough.

History
Fairway Island Lighthouse was built in 1904 and deactivated sometime between 1917 and 1925.

See also

 List of lighthouses in the United States

References

External links
  
 

Lighthouses completed in 1904
Buildings and structures in Sitka, Alaska
Lighthouses in Alaska
1904 establishments in Alaska